Peziza echinospora is a species of apothecial fungus belonging to the family Pezizaceae. This European fungus is found at old fire sites, appearing from late spring to early autumn as cups up to 10 cm in diameter. The inner surface is dark brown and smooth while the outer surface is pale, sometimes almost white, and rough.

References

Pezizaceae
Fungi described in 1866